The Kerma Museum is an archeological site museum located in front of the Western Deffufa on the archaeological site of Kerma, in the Northern State of Sudan. It opened in 2008 and contains many archaeological items removed from the Kerma culture, as well as a section focusing on the Christian and Islamic history of the region.

Architecture
The building of the museum is inspired by the traditional Nubian vaulted roof.

Displays
The museum contains artefacts of the main periods of the Kerma culture: Prehistory, Kingdoms of Kerma, Napata and Meroë. 

The highlight of the Kerma Museum are seven black granite statues uncovered in a ditch at the nearby site of Dukki Gel in 2003 by an archaeological team headed by Charles Bonnet. Deliberately broken, but in an excellent state of preservation, in the central room of the Museum are displayed the entirely reassembled statues portraying the Nubian Pharaohs Taharqa, Tanwetamani, Senkamanisken, Anlamani, and Aspelta, who ruled Egypt in the 25th Dynasty.

References

Museums in Sudan
Archaeological museums
History of Nubia
Kingdom of Kush
Museums established in 2008
2008 establishments in Sudan
Northern (state)